The Other Side: Live Album is a live album by Filipina singer Sarah Geronimo which was released on November 9, 2005. The concert featured Geronimo's duets with Piolo Pascual, Mark Bautista and Regine Velasquez. Japoy Lizardo was also her guest. She expressed wanting to sing with Nina, saying "Gusto ko rin sana na mag-guest si Nina dahil never pa kaming nagkasama pero, nagkataong may concert din siya the day after kaya di pwede". "I also wanted Nina to guest as we've never performed together but it just so happened that she also had a concert the day after so it couldn't be."

Track listing

References

External links
The Other Side on titikpilipino.com

Sarah Geronimo albums
2005 live albums